The 1992 Michigan State Spartans football team competed on behalf of Michigan State University as a member of the Big Ten Conference during the 1992 NCAA Division I-A football season. Led by tenth-year head caoch George Perles, the Spartans compiled an overall record of 5–6 with a mark of 5–3 in conference play, placing third in the Big Ten  Michigan State played home games at Spartan Stadium in East Lansing, Michigan.

Schedule

Roster

1993 NFL Draft
The following players were selected in the 1993 NFL Draft.

References

Michigan State
Michigan State Spartans football seasons
Michigan State Spartans football